Dhanbad Lok Sabha constituency is one of the 14 Lok Sabha (parliamentary)  constituencies in Jharkhand state in eastern India. This constituency covers parts of Bokaro and Dhanbad districts.

Assembly segments
Presently, Dhanbad Lok Sabha constituency comprises the following six Vidhan Sabha (legislative assembly) segments:

Members of Parliament

Election result

General election 2019

General election 2014

General election 2009

See also
 Dhanbad district
 List of Constituencies of the Lok Sabha

Notes

External links
Dhanbad lok sabha  constituency election 2019 result details

Lok Sabha constituencies in Jharkhand
Bokaro district
Dhanbad district